"Leiningen Versus the Ants" by Carl Stephenson is a classic short story published in the December 1938 edition of Esquire.  It is a translation, probably by Stephenson himself, of "Leiningens Kampf mit den Ameisen" which was originally published in German in 1938.

Plot summary
Leiningen, the owner of a plantation in the Brazilian rainforest, is warned by the district commissioner that a swarm of ferocious and organised soldier ants is approaching and that he must flee.  Unlike his neighbours, Leiningen is not about to give up years of hard work and planning to "an act of God", as he believes in the superiority of the human brain and has already made preparations.  He convinces his workers to stay and fight with him.

When the ants reach his estate, Leiningen seals it by filling a moat that surrounds it on four sides, the fourth being a river.  The ants attempt to cross over by covering the waters with tree leaves, but he thwarts them repeatedly by emptying then flooding the moat.  Eventually, the ants breach that line of defence and the men retreat behind a second moat, this time filled with petrol.  Leiningen is able to incinerate several waves of attack, but runs out of petrol when the pumps malfunction.  

After days of hard fighting, the ants breach the last defenses, and all seems lost.  However, Leiningen realizes that his original principle of canals and damming can be put to use: if he dams the main river itself, the whole plantation will flood, drowning all the ants.  He and his men can take refuge in the heights of the manor house on a hill.  However, this plan requires reaching the dam, long overrun by the ants.

Leiningen puts on a makeshift protective suit, douses himself with petrol, picks up two spray cans of petrol and runs for the dam — through the ants. He reaches the dam controls and floods the plantation; this means the destruction of his year's crop, but it will save his men, preserve the contents of his granaries and destroy the menace of the ants. The climax of the story occurs on the return journey when he is knocked down by the ants and almost devoured. Thinking about a stag he had seen the ants devour to the bones, he forces himself to get up. Despite suffering horrible injuries, including ant bites to the inside of his nose and directly below his eyes, Leiningen continues running, reaches the concrete ditch with the blazing petrol and survives. At the story's end, Leiningen awakes while recovering from his injuries; his final words before going to sleep are: "I told you I would come back, even if I am a bit streamlined."

Adaptations

In 1948, the story was adapted into a radio play as part of the CBS Radio series, Escape    with William Conrad providing the voice of Leiningen for the January 14th debut broadcast. Escape revived the story twice, on May 23, 1948 (again with Conrad as Leiningen) and on August 4, 1949 (with Tudor Owen as Leiningen). 

It was adapted in 1954 by Ranald MacDougall and Ben Maddow into the film The Naked Jungle, starring Charlton Heston as Leiningen and Eleanor Parker as his mail order bride Joanna, and featuring William Conrad as the commissioner. 

The story was again adapted into a radio play as part of the CBS Radio series, Suspense. William Conrad again provided the voice of Leiningen for the August 25, 1957 episode and Luis van Rooten played Leiningen in the November 29, 1959 episode.

The story inspired "Trumbo's World", the sixth episode of the television series MacGyver. Stock footage from The Naked Jungle was used in the episode.

It was parodied on the cartoon series Camp Candy.  In "Candy and the Ants", John Candy is faced with a swarm of voracious "navy ants", which he finally repels by importing anteaters. ("What kind of barbarians are we dealing with?" screams the ant admiral.)

The humor magazine National Lampoon parodied the story in a short story called "Leiningen and the Snails", in which the title character faces a swarm of "army snails", and has "merely three weeks" to think of a way to defend the plantation.  He eventually brings in by air enough garlic and butter to cook all the snails into escargot.

In November 2018, the short story was adapted for BBC Radio 4's 15 Minute Drama series with Timothy Watson playing the title character.

References

External links
 Leiningen Versus the Ants by Carl Stephenson (A history of the work) (archived link)
 Leiningen Versus the Ants (Full Text)

Streaming audio
Leiningen Versus the Ants on Escape: January 14, 1948 
Leiningen Versus the Ants on Escape: May 23, 1948
Leiningen Versus the Ants on Escape: August 4, 1949 
Leiningen Versus the Ants on Suspense: November 29, 1959 

1938 short stories
Fictional ants
German short stories
Horror short stories
Works originally published in Esquire (magazine)
Short stories adapted into films